James Maina Kamau is a Kenyan politician. He represented Kandara constituency as the member of parliament between the year 2007 to 2013 on party of national unity (PNU) ticket. He is currently serving as the deputy governor of Muranga county

References

Living people
Year of birth missing (living people)
Party of National Unity (Kenya) politicians
Members of the National Assembly (Kenya)